The Grand Prix du Morbihan Féminin is an elite women's professional one-day road bicycle race held in France and is currently rated by the UCI as a 1.1 race.

Past winners

References

External links 

Women's cycle races
Cycle races in France
Recurring sporting events established in 2011
2011 establishments in France